This is a list of Lebanese painters:
 Chaouki Chamoun
 Chafik Abboud
 Daniel Abillama
 Krikor Agopian
 Charles Andraos(artist)
 Zaher Bizri
 Fadi el Chamaa
 Saloua Raouda Choucair
 Maroun El Hakim
 Ali Talal Haidar
 Hind Herro
 Fouad Jawhar
 Hassan Jouni
 Nadim Karam
 Ali El Manini
 Farid Mansour (artist)
 Joseph Matar (artist)
 Mohammad Rawas
 Samir Sayegh
 Mouna Bassili Sehnaoui
 Michel Tamer (artist)
 Nabil Wehbe
 Bibi Zogbé

References
8. www.danielabillama.com 
8. One Fine Art Portal 
8. Lebanon Art 

 
Lebanon
Painters